Terrance A. Brooks (December 12, 1963 – June 13, 2011) was an American football player and coach.  He served as the head football coach at Kalamazoo College from 2005 to 2007, compiling a record of 7–21.

Brooks was a native of Union Bridge, Maryland.  He attended Towson State University—now Towson University—where he started for three years at right guard on the football team.  Brooks was signed as free agent by the Cleveland Browns of the National Football League, but a knee injury ended his career before he played a professional game.

Brooks began his coaching career at Lansdowne High School in Baltimore County, Maryland as head football coach.  There he also taught physical education and was an assistant coach for the track team.  He later served as an assistant football coach and strength and conditioning coordinator at Bridgewater College and Shenandoah University in Virginia.  He returned to his alma mater, Towson, in 2008 as a strength and conditioning coach, working with a number of the athletic teams there.  A year later, he moved to California State University, Sacramento.

Brooks died on June 13, 2011 during surgery at UC Davis Medical Center in Sacramento, California.  He was 47 years old.

Head coaching record

College

References

1963 births
2011 deaths
American football offensive guards
Bridgewater Eagles football coaches
Kalamazoo Hornets football coaches
Shenandoah Hornets football coaches
Towson Tigers football players
High school football coaches in Maryland
People from Union Bridge, Maryland
Coaches of American football from Maryland
Players of American football from Maryland